State League 1 is a semi-professional association football league in Victoria, Australia. Sitting at level 4 of the Victorian league system, below the three NPL Victoria divisions, it forms part of the fifth tier of the overall Australian league system. It is the highest-ranked of the five State Leagues.

The league consists of two geographic divisions, North-West and South-East, comprising 12 teams each. The champions of each division are promoted to NPL 3; the two bottom-placed teams in each division are replaced with the champions and runners-up of the corresponding State League 2 divisions.

The competition is administered by Football Victoria, the governing body of the sport in the state.

History
The league was founded in 1925 as Division 2 it has had many name changes such as Metropolitan League 1, and Victorian League Division 1. It was only known as State League Division 1 since 1991. Prior to the 2014 season, the league was the second highest in the Victoria. In the 2012 season, Pascoe Vale and Port Melbourne Sharks were promoted to the Victorian Premier League, while Whittlesea Ranges, Dandenong City and Springvale White Eagles were relegated. In the 2013 season, Heidelberg United was promoted back to the Victorian Premier League after being relegated to Victorian State League Division 1 in 2012.

Format
The champions and runners-up of State League Division 1 are promoted to the National Premier Leagues Victoria 2 for the 2014 season only. The top two teams of the Victorian State League Division 2 South-East and North-West, the third tier in Victoria and the fourth nationally, are promoted to Victorian State League Division 1 the next season and the bottom two teams the State League Division 1 are relegated. In 2016 FFV announced that there would be relegation and promotion to be introduced in the 2017 season with the champions of State League Division 1 North-West and South-East being promoted and the bottom 2 placed team of NPL3 Victoria being relegated to State League Division 1 North-West and South-East .

Clubs
The following 24 clubs from 2 conferences of 12 who are competing in the Victorian State League Division 1 during the 2023 season.

State League Division 1 North-West

State League Division 1 South-East

Past winners 
This is the list of past winners for State League Division 1, also called the Metropolitan League Division 1 and Victorian League Division 1.

Legend
 N: North
 NW: North-West
 S: South
 SE: South-East

Records 
Most points in a season: 75, Westvale (1998)

Fewest points in a season: -1, Melton Reds (1998)

Fewest points while winning the title: 18, Navy (1941)

Most points without winning the title: 62, Moorabbin City (1997)

Most goals scored in a single season: 110, Moreland FC (1952)

Most goals conceded in a single season: 174, Melton Reds (1998)

Most titles: 5, Heidelberg United

Most consecutive titles: 2, Nobels (1936–1937); Melbourne Knights (1961–1962); Mornington (2015–2016)

Notes

References

External links
Football Federation Victoria Official website

1
Professional sports leagues in Australia
fifth level football leagues in Asia